Indian Hill Village is a former shopping mall in Pomona, California.

History
The original, open-air mall was built in the mid-1950s as Pomona Valley Center. Its anchor store, a  Sears, had been dedicated in November 1954. Inline stores included Long's Drugs, F.C. Nash and J.J. Newberry. Between 1967 and 1969, the mall was expanded westward. A  Zody's discount store opened in June 1969, as the center's second anchor. One year later, the F.C. Nash store was sold to Roberts Department Store.

In 1974, the mall was renamed to Indian Hill Village, a name chosen by the mall owners in a contest. An enclosing renovation was completed in September 1982. The project was described as "the largest single commercial development in the city's history". In 1985, Sears moved to the Montclair Plaza Mall.

In 1995, part of the property was acquired by the Pomona Unified School District, which created the nonprofit Pomona Valley Educational Foundation to manage it; the foundation was dissolved in 2010. The conversion of the failing mall into an "impressive" educational facility has been cited as one of the chief accomplishments of then-school superintendent Patrick Leier.

The expanded property now houses multiple educational facilities which serve more than 2,000 students in grades pre-Kindergarten to 14. An eight-screen movie theater formerly in the mall was closed in September 2005, prompting the theater owner to sue the school district, alleging that the lease had been improperly terminated.

References

Defunct shopping malls in the United States
Buildings and structures in Pomona, California
Education in Los Angeles County, California
Shopping malls established in 1955
1955 establishments in California